Nik De Dominic (born January 1981) is an American poet and essayist.

He is the author of the poetry collection Goodbye Wolf and the chapbook Your Daily Horoscope. His work has appeared in DIAGRAM, Harpur Palate, Exquisite Corpse, The Los Angeles Review, Drunken Boat, Sonora Review, and elsewhere. He is a graduate of the University of Southern California and the University of Alabama.

He is a founding editor of The Offending Adam: A Journal of Poetics and the poetry editor of New Orleans Review.

De Dominic lives in Los Angeles, CA, co-founded and co-directs the Dornsife Prison Education Project at the University of Southern California, and teaches in USC's Writing Program.

References  
 The Offending Adam
 Harpur Palate

External links 
 42Opus. "Not Here, Not Dead" by Nik De Dominic
 Exquisite Corpse. Two Poems by Nik De Dominic
 DIAGRAM. "Postage Partum" by Nik De Dominic

1981 births
Living people
Writers from Los Angeles
Writers from California
University of Southern California alumni
University of Alabama alumni